McLaughlin is a lunar impact crater that is located just behind the northwestern rim on the far side of the Moon. This portion of the surface is sometimes brought into view of the Earth due to libration, and the area can then be viewed from a low angle under favorable lighting conditions. McLaughlin lies to the west-southwest of the crater Galvani. About two crater diameters due west lies Rynin.

This is a heavily eroded crater with an irregular rim that is mark by a number of smaller impacts. The interior floor is generally level, except for a low right offset to the southeast of the midpoint, and some irregularities near the southwest and northern inner walls. The interior is marked by several tiny craterlets.

Satellite craters
By convention these features are identified on lunar maps by placing the letter on the side of the crater midpoint that is closest to McLaughlin.

See also 
 2024 McLaughlin, minor planet
 McLaughlin (Martian crater)

References

 
 
 
 
 
 
 
 
 
 
 
 

Impact craters on the Moon